The 2016 Asian Junior Women's Volleyball Championship was held in Nakhon Ratchasima, Thailand from 23 July to 31 July 2016. It acted as the Asian qualifying tournament for the 2017 FIVB Volleyball Women's U20 World Championship.

Pools composition
Teams were seeded in the first two positions of each pool following the Serpentine system according to their final standing of the 2014 edition. AVC reserved the right to seed the hosts as head of Pool A regardless of the final standing of the 2014 edition. All teams not seeded were drawn. Final standing of the 2014 edition are shown in brackets except Hosts who ranked 4th.

Squads

Venues

Pool standing procedure
 Number of matches won
 Match points
 Sets ratio
 Points ratio
 Result of the last match between the tied teams

Match won 3–0 or 3–1: 3 match points for the winner, 0 match points for the loser
Match won 3–2: 2 match points for the winner, 1 match point for the loser

Preliminary round
All times are Indochina Time (UTC+07:00).

Pool A

|}

|}

Pool B

|}

|}

Pool C

|}

|}

Pool D

|}

|}

Classification round
All times are Indochina Time (UTC+07:00).
The results and the points of the matches between the same teams that were already played during the preliminary round shall be taken into account for the classification round.

Pool E

|}

|}

Pool F

|}

|}

Pool G

|}

|}

Pool H

|}

|}

Final round
All times are Indochina Time (UTC+07:00).

Classification 13th–15th

13th–15th semifinal

|}

13th place

|}

Classification 9th–12th

9th–12th semifinals

|}

11th place

|}

9th place

|}

Final eight

Quarterfinals

|}

5th–8th semifinals

|}

Semifinals

|}

7th place

|}

5th place

|}

3rd place

|}

Final

|}

Final standing

Team Roster
Yang Hanyu, Qian Jingwen, Jiang Jing, Zhang Yuqian, Xie Xing, Cai Yaqian, Ouyang Qianqian, Zang Qianqian, Cai Xiaoqing, Wu Han, Gao Yi, Xu Jianan
Head Coach: Shen Mang

Awards

MVP: 
  Wu Han
Best Setter: 
  Tamaki Matsui
Best Outside Spikers: 
  Cai Xiaoqing
  Reina Tokoku 

Best Middle Blockers: 
  Xie Xing
  Yang Hanyu
Best Opposite Spiker:
  Pimpichaya Kokram
Best Libero:
  Yukako Yasui

See also
 2016 Asian Junior Men's Volleyball Championship

References

External links

2016
A
2016 in Thai sport
Sport in Nakhon Ratchasima province
Asian women's volleyball championships
V
Asian Junior